The Grammy Award  – Best Classical Vocal Solo has been awarded since 1959.  There have been several minor changes to the name of the award over this time:

From 1959 to 1960 and from 1962 to 1964  the award was known as Best Classical Performance - Vocal Soloist (with or without orchestra)  
In 1961 it was awarded as Best Classical Performance - Vocal Soloist
In 1965 it was awarded as Best Vocal Soloist Performance (with or without orchestra)
In 1966, 1968 and from 1971 to 1990 it was awarded as Best Classical Vocal Soloist Performance
In 1967 it was awarded as Best Classical Vocal Soloist Performance (with or without orchestra)
In 1969 it was awarded as Best Vocal Soloist Performance
In 1970 it was awarded as Best Vocal Soloist Performance, Classical
In 1991 it was awarded as Best Classical Vocal Performance  
In 1992 it was awarded as Best Classical Vocal Soloist
From 1993 to 2011 it returned to being awarded as Best Classical Vocal Performance
From 2012 to 2014 it was awarded as Best Classical Vocal Solo
From 2015 the award has been known as Best Classical Solo Vocal Album and is open for albums only (in previous years single tracks were also eligible for the award, although in most cases the awards and nominations went to albums)

Up to and including 2015, the Grammy was awarded to one or more vocal soloist(s). Accompanying musicians, orchestras and/or conductors were not eligible for the award. From 2016, "collaborative artists" (such as solo accompanists, conductors or chamber groups) have also been included. Accompanying large orchestras or multiple instrumentalists, however, remain ineligible. Producer(s) and engineer(s) of over 50% of playing time on the recording also receive an award.

Years reflect the year in which the Grammy Awards were presented, for works released in the previous year.

Recipients

muhReferences

Grammy Awards for classical music